Valerio Ángel Vallania (14 July 1906 – 8 October 1998) was an Argentine hurdler and high jumper. He competed in the men's 110 metres hurdles at the 1928 Summer Olympics. He achieved his personal best in high jump at 1.91 metres on 26 March 1932. That was new South American record.

References

External links

1906 births
1998 deaths
Athletes (track and field) at the 1928 Summer Olympics
Argentine male hurdlers
Argentine male high jumpers
Olympic athletes of Argentina
20th-century Argentine people